The BK virus is a member of the polyomavirus family.  Past infection with the BK virus is widespread, but significant consequences of infection are uncommon, with the exception of the immunocompromised and the immunosuppressed. BK virus is an abbreviation of the name of the first patient, from whom the virus was isolated in 1971 (the patient was then 29 years old).

Signs and symptoms
The BK virus rarely causes disease but is typically associated with patients who have had a kidney transplant; many people who are infected with this virus are asymptomatic. If symptoms do appear, they tend to be mild: respiratory infection or fever. These are known as primary BK infections. Although without any clinical symptoms, footprints of BK virus have been detected in specimens from females affected by spontaneous abortion. Serum antibodies against BK virus have also been found in spontaneous abortion affected women as well as in women who underwent voluntary interruption of pregnancy.

The virus then disseminates to the kidneys and urinary tract where it persists for the life of the individual.  It is thought that up to 80% of the population contains a latent form of this virus, which remains latent until the body undergoes some form of immunosuppression. Typically, this is in the setting of kidney transplantation or multi-organ transplantation. Presentation in these immunocompromised individuals is much more severe.  Clinical manifestations include renal dysfunction (seen by a progressive rise in serum creatinine), and an abnormal urinalysis revealing renal tubular cells and inflammatory cells.

Cause

Transmission
It is not known how this virus is transmitted, except that it spreads from person to person, and not from an animal source. It has been suggested that this virus may be transmitted through respiratory fluids or urine, since infected individuals periodically excrete virus in the urine.  A survey of 400 healthy blood donors was reported as showing that 82% were positive for IgG against BK virus.

Risk factors
In some renal transplant patients, the necessary use of immunosuppressive drugs has the side-effect of allowing the virus to replicate within the graft, a disease called BK nephropathy.
From 1–10% of renal transplant patients progress to BK virus associated nephropathy (BKVAN) and up to 80% of these patients lose their grafts.  The onset of nephritis can occur as early as several days post-transplant to as late as 5 years.

It is also associated with ureteral stenosis and interstitial nephritis. In bone marrow transplant recipients it is notable as a cause for hemorrhagic cystitis.

BK viremia load > 185 000 copies/ml at the time of first positive BKV diagnosis - to be the strongest predictor for BKVAN (97% specificity and 75% sensitivity). In addition the BKV peak viral loads in blood reaching 223 000 copies/ml at any time was found to be predictive for BKVAN (91% specificity and 88% sensitivity) .

Diagnosis

This virus can be diagnosed by a BKV blood test or a urine test for decoy cells, in addition to carrying out a biopsy in the kidneys. PCR techniques are often carried out to identify the virus.

Treatment
The cornerstone of therapy is reduction in immunosuppression.  A recent surge in BKVAN correlates with use of potent immunosuppressant drugs, such as tacrolimus and mycophenolate mofetil (MMF).  Studies have not shown any correlation between BKVAN and a single immunosuppressive agent but rather the overall immunosuppressive load.
 No guidelines or drug levels and doses exist for proper reduction of immunosuppressants in BKVAN
 Most common methods:
 Withdrawal of MMF or tacrolimus
 Replacement of tacrolimus by cyclosporine
 Overall reduction of immunosuppressive load
 Some cyclosporine trough levels reported to be reduced to 100–150 ng/ml and tacrolimus levels reduced to 3–5 ng/ml
 Retrospective analysis of 67 patients concluded graft survival was similar between reduction and discontinuation of agents.
 Single center study showed renal allografts were preserved in 8/8 individuals managed with reduction in immunosuppression while graft loss occurred in 8/12 patients treated with an increase in therapy for what was thought to be organ rejection.

Other therapeutic options include Leflunomide, Cidofovir, IVIG, and the fluoroquinolones.  Leflunomide, a pyrimidine synthesis inhibitor is now generally accepted as the second treatment option behind reduction of immunosuppression.

Leflunomide in BKVAN
The rationale behind using leflunomide in BKVAN comes from its combined immunosuppressive and antiviral properties.  Two studies consisting of 26 and 17 patients who developed BKVAN on a three-drug regimen of tacrolimus, MMF, and steroids had their MMF replaced with leflunomide 20–60 mg daily.  84 and 88% of patients, respectively had clearance or a progressive reduction in viral load and a stabilization or improvement of graft function (7).  In a study conducted by Teschner et al. in 2009, 12/13 patients who had their MMF exchanged with leflunomide cleared the virus by 109 days.  In a case series, there was improvement or stabilization in 23/26 patients with BKVAN after switching MMF to leflunomide.

There are no dosing guidelines for leflunomide in BKVAN.  Patient to patient variability has made dosing and monitoring of leflunomide extremely difficult.
 Study of 26 and 17 patients were dosed between 20 mg/day and 60 mg/day with trough levels of 50—100 µg/ml.  Failure was seen in patients with leflunomide plasma levels < 40 µg/ml.
 One study of 21 patients found that low levels (< 40 µg/ml) and high levels (> 40 µg/ml) had similar effects on the rate of viral clearance.  Those with higher levels had more adverse events (hematologic, hepatic).
 In the study by Teschner et al., dosages and drug concentration showed no correlation with substantial variation from person to person.
 In the Teschner study, low drug concentrations were associated with decrease in viral load.  This makes it difficult to determine whether or not reduction of viral load or addition of leflunomide was the cause for viral clearance.

Other treatment options
 Quinolone antibiotics: Ciprofloxacin (Cipro) was shown to significantly lower viral loads but no data on survival and graft loss exist.
 Intravenous immunoglobulin (IVIG) has use in the treatment of infection and allograft rejection – hard to distinguish
 Cidofovir has limited data and is highly nephrotoxic.

History

The BK virus was first isolated in 1971 from the urine of a renal transplant patient, initials B.K. The BK virus is similar to another virus called the JC virus (JCV), since their genomes share 75% sequence similarity. Both of these viruses can be identified and differentiated from each other by carrying out serological tests using specific antibodies or by using a PCR-based genotyping approach.

See also
 Decoy cells
 Low-dose naltrexone

References

External links 

 Overview of the BK virus
 MicrobiologyBytes: Polyomaviruses
 
 
 

Polyomaviridae